The 2021 Campeonato Tocantinense de Futebol was the 29rd edition of the Tocantins's top professional football league. The competition began on 20 February and was suspended in April due to the COVID-19 pandemic. In October, the Federação Tocantinense de Futebol (FTF) confirmed the return of the tournament on 12 December. The tournament ended on 30 December. Palmas were the defending champions but were eliminated in the semi-finals.

Initially, the two teams with the lowest number of points in the first stage would be relegated to the Segunda Divisão. However, FTF cancelled the relegations due to the suspension of the Campeonato caused by pandemic. 

In the finals, Tocantinópolis defeated Araguacema 2–0 on aggregate to win their fourth title.

Participating Clubs
Araguacema (Araguacema)
Capital (Palmas)
Gurupi (Gurupi)
Interporto (Porto Nacional)
NC/Paraíso (Paraíso do Tocantins)
Palmas (Palmas)
Tocantinópolis (Tocantinópolis)
Tocantins (Miracema do Tocantins)

First stage
The match Tocantins v Gurupi was cancelled.

Final stage

References 

Tocantins
Campeonato Tocantinense
Campeonato Tocantinense